Dedicated was Barry White's fifteenth studio album. Released in March 1983. White's popularity and record sales were at an all-time low and, as a consequence, his relationship with CBS Records had soured. Dedicated and his album Rise with the Love Unlimited Orchestra, released around the same time, sold abysmally and, like its singles, failed to chart anywhere. All the tracks were recorded at White's R.I.S.E. studio in the grounds of Sherman Oaks, with White & Jack Perry playing all instruments of the rhythm section themselves. Gene Page added the strings. White wrote on the back cover: This album is personally DEDICATED to my mother, Miss Sadie Marie Carter, for she dedicated her life to the children with the knowledge of peace, harmony and goodwill toward man. With my deepest love and love forever, your son.  This was the fourth consecutive album where the UK label passed on releasing any singles.

Cover versions 
"All in the Run of One Day" was a new recording of one of White's early recordings from 1967. "Dreams" was a revamp of a track from the Love Unlimited Orchestra's 1981 album with Webster Lewis. "Love Song" was a cover of an early Elton John-song, written by Lesley Duncan.

Recording hiatus 
CBS released White of his contract in 1984. Since 1977, 14 albums had been released in total on his Unlimited Gold label, five by himself, one duet album with his wife Glodean, one album by Love Unlimited, three by the Love Unlimited Orchestra, and one each by his signings Danny Pearson and Jimmie & Vella Cameron. Its biggest success had been a 1980 2-LP set of his greatest hits from his 20th Century-years. White had lost an estimated $10M over those 7 years. CBS was that keen to get out of their deal that they even returned all the mastertapes to White. In April 1984, White received a phone call from Marvin Gaye who wanted him to produce his next album. Only the next day, he woke up to the news that Gaye had been killed by his dad. For the next three years, White survived on royalty checks from his glory years and the occasional touring, before finding new spirit when he signed with A&M Records and started recording again.

CD reissues 
The album would see a CD release in 1993. In 1996, Japan re-issued the album on a gatefold miniature LP-replica compact disc.

Track listing 
 "America" (Barry White) - 5:47
 "Free" (Barry White, Carl Taylor, Ricky Robertson) - 5:45
 "Don't Forget ... Remember" (White) - 5:45
 "Life" (Barry White, Jack Perry) - 3:40
 "Love Song" (Lesley Duncan) - 5:50
 "All in the Run of a Day" (Barry White, Robert Staunton) - 6:55
 "Don't Let 'Em Blow Your Mind" (White, Perry) - 6:48
 "Dreams" (Barry White, Webster Lewis) - 4:20

Singles

 "America" (3:39) / "Life" (4:30) (Unlimited Gold, ZS4 03957)
 "Don't Let Them Blow Your Mind" (4:32) / "Dreams" (4:06) (Unlimited Gold, ZS4 04098)

References

Barry White albums
1983 albums